Garnet Rogers (born May 1955) is a Canadian folk musician, singer, songwriter and composer. He was born in Hamilton, Ontario with roots in Nova Scotia. He began his professional career working with his older brother, folk musician Stan Rogers, and arranging Stan's music.

Career
Despite Stan Rogers' death on June 2, 1983 (just a few weeks before Stan, Garnet and bass player Jim Morison were to tour the US), Garnet Rogers has pursued his own career since then.

At first, Rogers had difficulty getting a permit from the U.S. Immigration Service, which only granted one after a campaign on his behalf was launched by Odetta, The Boston Globe, and a PBS TV station in New York.

While his brother's style of writing was more traditional and often based on Canadian Maritime styles, Rogers' style is more modern, utilizing influences from blues, rock, country/bluegrass, and classical.

Rogers' instruments include the guitar, mandolin, violin, and flute. In live performances, he usually sits beside a guitar rack that includes three vintage Gibson acoustic guitars, a National guitar, a Fender Stratocaster, and sometimes a Hammertone Octave 12 (half-scale electric 12-string guitar).

Rogers' songs include The Outside Track, All That Is, Sleeping Buffalo, Night Drive, Under The Summer Moonlight, Summer Lightning, Small Victory, and Frankie and Johnny. They range from slices of life to mild social commentary and humour. His humour is also seen in his on-stage banter between songs, mostly unrecorded, except for a couple of interludes on his brother's posthumous album, "Home in Halifax". In addition, Garnet has covered other folk artists' work, including Roy Forbes' (Bim's) Woh Me, and Archie Fisher's The Final Trawl. His collaborators include Doug McArthur and Doug Long.

Rogers has also written "Night Drive," a memoir of his travels with his brother Stan, who died in a fire aboard an Air Canada flight in 1983.

Personal life
Garnet lives on a farm in Brantford, Ontario, where his wife Gail raises champion thoroughbreds. They also own a house in Nova Scotia.

Solo albums
 Garnet Rogers (1984)
 The Outside Track (1985)
 Speaking Softly in the Dark (1988)
 Small Victories (1990)
 At A High Window (1992)
 Summer Lightning [Live] (1994)
 Night Drive (1996)
 Sparrow's Wing (1999)
 Firefly (2001)
 Shining Thing (2004)
 Get a Witness [Live] (2007)
 Summer's End (2014)

Other albums
  Off the Map with Archie Fisher (1986)
  Doug McArthur with Garnet Rogers (1989)
  All That Is (The Songs of Garnet Rogers) (2002) [Red House Records]
  Live at the Black Sheep (2003)
  The Best Times After All [Live] with Archie Fisher (2019)

See also
Eileen McGann—Irish-Canadian female Celtic folksinger. They started out professionally in the same timeframe, played many of the same venues in their early days, and Garnet Rogers appeared on some of her early recordings.
Gordon Lightfoot
Roy Orbison

References

External links
 Garnet Rogers' official webpage

1955 births
Living people
Canadian folk guitarists
Canadian male guitarists
Canadian folk singers
Canadian male songwriters
Canadian male composers
Musicians from Brantford
Musicians from Hamilton, Ontario
Red House Records artists
20th-century Canadian composers
21st-century Canadian composers
20th-century Canadian male singers
21st-century Canadian male singers